Pandharpur was a Lok Sabha parliamentary constituency of Maharashtra.

Pandharpur (पंढरपुर) is in Solapur District.

Members of Parliament

See also
 Pandharpur
 List of Constituencies of the Lok Sabha

Former Lok Sabha constituencies of Maharashtra
Former constituencies of the Lok Sabha
2008 disestablishments in India
Constituencies disestablished in 2008